Ponemah (Ojibwe language Obaashiing) is a census-designated place (CDP) within the Lower Red Lake unorganized territory in Beltrami County, Minnesota, United States. The population was 724 at the 2010 census.

History
Though its name in the Ojibwe language is "Obaashiing" meaning "At the narrows", "Ponemah" is derived from another Ojibwe word baanimaa, meaning "later (on), after(wards)", as used in The Song of Hiawatha. Ponemah contained a government school for Ojibwe children. A post office called Ponemah has been in operation since 1901.

Geography

Demographics

As of the census of 2000, there were 874 people, 209 households, and 174 families residing in the CDP. There were 215 housing units at an average density of 11.0/sq mi (4.2/km). The racial makeup of the CDP was 0.34% White, 99.20% Native American, 0.23% from other races, and 0.23% from two or more races. Hispanic or Latino of any race were 1.83% of the population. It is the most Native American census designated location in the United States by Percent.

There were 209 households, out of which 51.2% had children under the age of 18 living with them, 21.1% were married couples living together, 44.5% had a female householder with no husband present, and 16.7% were non-families. 13.9% of all households were made up of individuals, and 1.9% had someone living alone who was 65 years of age or older.  The average household size was 4.18 and the average family size was 4.37.

In the CDP, the population was spread out, with 49.5% under the age of 18, 13.3% from 18 to 24, 23.1% from 25 to 44, 11.6% from 45 to 64, and 2.5% who were 65 years of age or older.  The median age was 18 years. For every 100 females, there were 105.6 males.  For every 100 females age 18 and over, there were 107.0 males.

The median income for a household is $13,571, and the median income for a family was $13,527. Males had a median income of $21,250 versus $16,719 for females. The per capita income for the CDP was $4,000.  About 57.3% of families and 52.3% of the population were below the poverty line, including 52.7% of those under age 18 and 58.3% of those age 65 or over.

Politics

Education
It is in the Red Lake School District, which operates Ponemah Elementary School (K-8), and Red Lake Secondary Complex (formerly Red Lake High School).

References

Census-designated places in Beltrami County, Minnesota
Census-designated places in Minnesota
Ojibwe in Minnesota
Anishinaabe communities in the United States